Raktha Tilakam is a 1988 Indian Telugu-language action film directed by B. Gopal and produced by K. Ashok Kumar under the Sri Usha Art Productions banner. It stars Venkatesh and Amala , with music composed by Chakravarthy. The film was a remake of the Bengali film Pratikar (1987) which was also remade in Tamil in as Thaimel Aanai (1988). The film was recorded as a Super Hit at the box office.

Plot
Krishna Prasad is a son of a rich man, Satyanarayana Prasad (Jaggayya); in his childhood, his father's younger brother Garupmantha Rao (Nutan Prasad) kills his brother for the property and Krishna Prasad is driven out of the house. Krishna Prasad goes to live with his school-teacher Nagamani (Sharada), whom he treats as his own mother, she has two children, Balaram and Jyoti, of her own. Garupmantha Rao tries to kill Krishna also, but unfortunately Balaram is separated from his family, and is assumed dead. Nagamani looks after Krishna and Jyoti. After 20 years, Krishna Prasad (Venkatesh) falls in love with his college friend Radha (Amala). Raghu (Sudhakar), son of Garupmantha Rao becomes a local goon, protected by his dad by bribing the local police Inspector P.K. Pathi (Giri Babu). Jyoti (Poornima) is raped and murdered by Raghu and his pals, and they also run over Nagamani, rendering her crippled. Both Krishna and Nagamani swear to avenge Jyoti's death. Then Balaram (Siva Krishna) re-enters their lives, as a police inspector, and is bent on arresting Krishna by hook or by crook, casting doubts whether he is or not on the payroll.

Cast

Venkatesh as Krishna Prasad
Amala as Radha
D. Ramanaidu as himself
Sharada as Nagamani
Nutan Prasad as Garupmantha Rao
Jaggayya as Satyanarayana Prasad
Siva Krishna as Inspector Balaram
Giri Babu as Inspector P.K. Pathi
Sudhakar as Raghu
Rallapalli as Hrundeswara Rao
P. L. Narayana as Basavaiah
Suthi Velu as Hapil Satry
Chalapathi Rao as Pandu
Pradeep Shakthi as Dasu
Raj Varma as Raju 
Vankayala Satyanarayana 
Bheemiswara Rao as Judge
KK Sarma as Rangaiah
Ramana Reddy as Ramana
Gundu Hanumantha Rao as Watchman
Juttu Narasimham  
Pournima as Jyothi
Rama Prabha as Hrundeswara Rao's wife
Srilakshmi as Banthi Kumari
Sudha as Rekha
Nirmalamma as Basavamma

Soundtrack

Music composed by Chakravarthy. Music released on SAPTASWAR Audio Company.

References

External links

1988 films
Telugu remakes of Bengali films
Films directed by B. Gopal
Films scored by K. Chakravarthy
1980s Telugu-language films
Indian films about revenge
Indian rape and revenge films